Johannes Jacobus 'Hannes' Strydom (born 13 July 1965, in Welkom), is a former South African rugby union player who played for the South Africa national rugby union team between 1993 and 1997. He went to school at Pearson High School in Port Elizabeth and the A rugby field is named after him. He is now a pharmacist in Pretoria.

Playing career

Provincial
Strydom represented the  Schools team at the 1983 and 1984 Craven Week tournaments. In 1986 he made his senior provincial debut for Eastern Province. He also represented  and from 1993,  that later became the Golden Lions, where he formed a formidable combination with Kobus Wiese.

International
He played his first test match for the Springboks on 3 July 1993 against France at Ellis Park. He toured with the Springboks to Australia and Argentina in 1993, playing in all the test matches during the tours. In 1994 he played only one test match and in 1995 was a member of the World Cup squad and also played in the World Cup final. He continued to represent South Africa during the 1996 and 1997 seasons, including the test series against the 1997 British Lions. Strydom also played in nine tour matches.

Test history 
 World Cup Final

World Cup
 1995 World Cup in South Africa : 4 games (Wallabies, Canada, France, All Blacks).

Accolades
In 2003 he was inducted into the University of Pretoria Sport Hall of fame.

See also

List of South Africa national rugby union players – Springbok no. 586

References

External links
Springboks 1996
Statistics at scrum.com

South African rugby union players
South Africa international rugby union players
1965 births
Living people
University of Pretoria alumni
Lions (United Rugby Championship) players
Golden Lions players
Rugby union locks
Rugby union players from the Free State (province)